Mikira (Miquira, Shuensampi, Suensampi) is an extinct Cahuapanan language that was spoken in the single village of Maucallacta on the Paranapura River in northern Peru. It is closely related to Jebero.

Word list
A word list of Mikira was collected by Czech explorer . At the time of the data collection, the language and tribe were already nearly extinct, as Vráz had found only five houses in the village of Maucallacta. Vráz's list was subsequently published in Loukotka (1949):

{| class="wikitable sortable"
! French gloss (original) !! English gloss (translated) !! Mikirá
|-
| bande à cheveux || hair band || akča
|-
| cannot || canoe || nunga
|-
| chauve-souris || bat || mašu
|-
| chien || dog || nini
|-
| coq || cock || guatadi
|-
| crécelle || rattle || gingile
|-
| crocodile || crocodile || tára
|-
| eau || water || íde
|-
| écorce || bark, skin || mapa
|-
| feu || fire || punga
|-
| gourdin || club, cudgel || nara
|-
| hamac || hammock || taila
|-
| lune || moon || rúki
|-
| maïs || but || čiči
|-
| manger || eat || káki
|-
| nuit || night || rupiye
|-
| ornement d’escarbots || scarab ornament || kurišundu
|-
| ornement de roseau jaune || yellow reed ornament || pelantse
|-
| ornement de plumages et d’os de dindon || turkey feather and bone ornament || tayatudlú
|-
| ornement de grands fruits secs || large dried fruit ornament || pinganamuyu
|-
| pierre || stone || napi
|-
| poison de flèches || poison arrow || pišuaya
|-
| singe || monkey || kamuka
|-
| soleil || sun || kogua
|-
| tête || head || humato
|-
| tête-trophée || trophy head || huma
|-
| vêtement de femmes || women's clothing || pampayina
|-
| vêtement fait de plumages de toucan || clothing made of toucan feathers || kalinga
|-
| viande || meat || lulunga
|}

References

Languages of Peru
Cahuapanan languages